Marcus Priaulx (born 26 September 1967) is an Australian boxer. He competed in the men's bantamweight event at the 1988 Summer Olympics. At the 1988 Summer Olympics, he lost to Phajol Moolsan of Thailand.

References

1967 births
Living people
Australian male boxers
Olympic boxers of Australia
Boxers at the 1988 Summer Olympics
Place of birth missing (living people)
Bantamweight boxers